Ayano Sato (born 29 December 1996) is a Japan slalom canoeist who has competed at the international level since 2015.

She represented the host country in the C1 event at the delayed 2020 Summer Olympics in Tokyo, where she finished in 20th position after being eliminated in the heats.

References

External links

1996 births
Living people
Japanese female canoeists
Canoeists at the 2020 Summer Olympics
Olympic canoeists of Japan